The Castilian War, also called the Spanish Expedition to Borneo, was a conflict between the Spanish Empire and several Muslim states in Southeast Asia, including the Sultanates of Brunei, Sulu, and Maguindanao, and supported by the Ottoman Caliphate.

Background
After the Fall of Constantinople in 1453, European states were separated from important sources of spices and other luxury goods in Southeast Asia by a series of strong and hostile nations, including the Ottomans, Persians, Arabs, Indians, and Malays. Because of this, they were eager to gain a permanent foothold in Southeast Asia to secure a steady supply of spices. In addition, Spain sought to forcibly proselytize the region and increase the acceptance of Christianity in the predominantly Muslim countries of the area. The Spanish Empire first began to establish control in the Philippine archipelago. Their attempts to spread Christianity in the archipelago caused conflict with the Sultanate of Brunei, then ruled by Sultan Saiful Rijal, which was a dominant maritime empire stretching from Borneo into the Philippines.

Spanish arrival in the Philippines 
In 1565, Spain began to send several expeditions to the Philippines from their ports in Mexico. Under Miguel López de Legazpi, they settled in Cebu, which soon became the Spanish capital of the archipelago and its primary trading post.

The Spanish settlements soon began to encroach on the aspirations that Brunei had in the Philippines. Between 1485 and 1521, Sultan Bolkiah of Brunei had established the puppet state of Kota Serudong (also called the Kingdom of Maynila) to oppose the indigenous Kingdom of Tondo on the island of Luzon. The Islamic presence in the region was also strengthened by the arrival of traders and missionaries from the areas of Malaysia and Indonesia.

Despite Bruneian influence, Spanish colonization continued in the archipelago. In 1571, Miguel López launched an expedition from his capital in Cebu to conquer and Christianize the city of Manila, which became the new capital for the Spanish administration. Furthermore, the Visayan peoples of Madja-as and Cebu (who historically fought against Brunei's allies of Sulu and Maynila) aligned themselves with the Spaniards against Brunei. In 1576, Governor-General Francisco de Sande sent a request to meet with Sultan Saiful Rijal, expressing a desire for good relations with Brunei. However, the Governor-General demanded both permission to proselytize Christianity in the region, and an end to Brunei's proselytizing of Islam. De Sand regarded Brunei as a threat to Spanish presence and religious efforts in the region, stating that "the Moros from Borneo preach the doctrine of Mohammed, converting all the Moros of the islands". Sultan Rijal refused, expressing strong opposition to Spanish efforts to convert the Philippines, which he considered part of Dar al-Islam, the Muslim world.

War
Governor-General Francisco de Sande officially declared war against Brunei in 1578, and began preparations for an expedition to Borneo. De Sande assumed the title of Capitán-General and assembled a fleet carrying 200 Spaniards, 200 Mexicans, 1,500 native Filipinos (Luzones), and 300 Borneans. The racial composition of the Spanish force was shown to be diverse by later documents that stated the infantry was made up of mestizos, mulattoes, and "Indians" (from Peru and Mexico), led by Spanish officers who had previously fought with native Filipinos in military campaigns across Southeast Asia. The expedition began their journey in March, and the Bruneian campaign was one of several that was undertaken at the time, including action in Mindanao and Sulu.

The Bruneians were supported by an equally diverse Muslim force. In addition to native Malay warriors, they were supported by Ottoman forces thathad been sent in several expeditions to the nearby Sultanate of Aceh and were composed of Turks, Egyptians, Swahilis, Somalis, Sindhis, Gujaratis, and Malabars. These expeditionary forces spread to nearby Sultanates and taught local mujahideen new fighting tactics and techniques to forge cannons. In addition, Muslim migration from the Ottoman Caliphate, Egypt, and Arabia brought numerous fighting men to the region of Borneo. The migration was so constant that local Spanish official complained:

While early fighting was fierce, Spain was quickly able to invade and conquer the capital of Brunei, Kota Batu, by 16 April 1578. Spain enlisted the help of two disgruntled Bruneian nobles, Seri Lela and Seri Ratna, the former of whom had arrived to offer Brunei as a tributary in exchange for recovering the throne from his brother, the current Sultan Saiful Rijal. After taking the capital, the Spanish installed Seri Lela as Sultan and Seri Ratna as the new Bendahara, or head of the nobility.

With the fall of his capital, Sultan Saiful Rijal and his court fled to the nearby down of Jerudong, where they prepared to launch a counterattack and retake Kota Batu. While the Bruneians were gathering themselves for an assault, the Spanish force occupying the capital greatly weakened by an outbreak of cholera and dysentery. After a short time, Saiful Rijal led a force of around a thousand native warriors who were able to drive out the outnumbered and outgunned Spaniards. Before their retreat, they burned and destroyed the city's mosque. After just 72 days, the Spanish returned to Manila on 26 June.

Aftermath
While the Spanish were unable to immediately subjugate Brunei, they did manage to prevent it from regaining a foothold in Luzon. Relations between the two nations later improved and trade resumed, as evidenced by a 1599 letter from Governor-General Francisco de Tello de Guzmán in which he asked for a return to a normal relationship. With the end of hostilities, Spain was able to focus its attention towards the ongoing Spanish-Moro Wars in the Philippines.

As a result of the conflict, Brunei ceased to be an empire at sea. It gradually set aside its policies of territorial expansion and developed into a city-state, surviving to the modern day as the oldest continuously Islamic political entity.

Notes

References

 
 
 
 
 
 
 

Wars involving the Philippines
Wars involving Spain
Wars involving Brunei